An electricity price area is a zone throughout which the electricity is traded at the same spot price on a power exchange. An electricity price area is decided by transmission system operator and can be a whole country, or parts of it.

EPADs and price area risk 
The electricity price usually differs from the system price from one price area to another, e.g. when there are constraints in the transmission grid. A special contract for difference called Electricity Price Area Differentials or EPAD allows members on the power exchange to hedge against this market risk called area price risk.

See also 
 Nord Pool Spot
 Nordic energy market
 Electricity sector in Sweden
 Electricity sector in Norway

References

Electricity markets
Financial risk